Charvarius Ward (born May 16, 1996) is an American football cornerback for the San Francisco 49ers of the National Football League (NFL). He played college football at Middle Tennessee.

Early years
Ward only had three years of high school at McComb High School. He went from being a freshman to a junior in high school. As a senior, he tallied 48 tackles, one interception and received All-region honors.

He enrolled at Hinds Community College. As a freshman, he collected 32 tackles, 3 interceptions, 5 passes defended and one forced fumble. As a sophomore, he recorded 32 tackles, one interception, 2 passes defended and one blocked kick.

He transferred to Middle Tennessee State University for his junior season, appearing in 12 games with 2 starts, while making 26 tackles, 2 interceptions, 5 passes defended, one quarterback hurry and one fumble recovery. As a senior, he played in 13 games with 8 starts, posting 48 tackles (sixth on the team), 3 tackles for loss, one sack and led the team with 14 passes defended.

Professional career
Ward did not receive an invitation to attend the NFL Combine. On January 20, 2018, Ward played the NFLPA Collegiate Bowl. On March 12, 2018, Ward attended Middle Tennessee State's pro day and performed all of the combine and positional drills. He had a stellar performance at his pro day which greatly elevated his draft stock. At the conclusion of the pre-draft process, Ward was ranked as the 46th best cornerback prospect in the draft by DraftScout.com.

Dallas Cowboys
On April 30, 2018, the Dallas Cowboys signed Ward to a three-year, $1.71 million contract that includes a signing bonus of $5,000.

Throughout training camp, Ward competed to be the fifth cornerback on the active roster against Marquez White, Duke Thomas, and Donovan Olumba.

Kansas City Chiefs

2018
On August 30, 2018, the Kansas City Chiefs traded offensive guard Parker Ehinger to the Dallas Cowboys in exchange for Ward to provide needed depth for their offensive line. Head coach Andy Reid named Ward the fifth backup cornerback on the active roster to begin the regular season, behind Steven Nelson, Kendall Fuller, Orlando Scandrick, and Tremon Smith.

On October 1, 2018, Ward made his professional regular season debut and recorded three combined tackles during a 27–23 victory at the Denver Broncos in Week 3. On December 23, 2018, Ward earned his first career start after Kendall Fuller was ruled inactive due to a thumb injury. He recorded eight combined tackles and deflected a pass as the Chiefs lost 38–31 at the Seattle Seahawks in Week 16. Ward finished his rookie season in 2018 with 30 combined tackles (26 solo) and three pass deflections in 13 games and two starts.

The Kansas City Chiefs finished first in the AFC West with a 12–4 record and earned a first round bye. On January 12, 2019, Ward started in his first career playoff game and recorded four combined tackles and deflected four passes during a 31–13 win against the Indianapolis Colts in the AFC Divisional Round. The following week, he collected seven combined tackles in the Chiefs' 37–31 loss against the New England Patriots in the AFC Championship Game. With 54 seconds remaining in the game, Ward caught what would've been the game-ending interception to send the Chiefs to Super Bowl LIII, but the play did not stand due to a Roughing the passer penalty by defensive end Dee Ford on Tom Brady.

2019
Ward competed against Bashaud Breeland to be a starting cornerback. Head coach Andy Reid named Ward and Bashaud Breeland the starting cornerbacks to begin the regular season in 2019. On September 15, 2019, Ward made four combined tackles, two pass deflections, and made his first career interception during a 28–10 win at the Oakland Raiders in Week 2. Ward intercepted a pass by Derek Carr, that was originally intended for wide receiver Ryan Grant, and returned it for a ten-yard gain during the third quarter.  Ward then made his second interception against the Houston Texans, by snagging a one handed interception over DeAndre Hopkins. Ward helped the Chiefs reach Super Bowl LIV where they defeated the San Francisco 49ers by a score of 31–20. Ward recorded four tackles in the game.

2020
In Week 7 against the Denver Broncos, Ward recorded a team high nine tackles and sacked Drew Lock once during the 43–16 win. Overall, Ward finished the 2020 season with 51 total tackles, one sack, and six passes defended.

2021
The Chiefs placed a second-round restricted free agent tender on Ward on March 17, 2021. He signed the one-year contract on June 10. He was placed on the Reserve/COVID-19 list on December 20, 2021. He was activated off on December 23, 2021.

San Francisco 49ers
On March 17, 2022, Ward signed a three-year, $42 million contract with the San Francisco 49ers.

References

External links
Kansas City Chiefs bio
 Middle Tennessee State Blue Raiders bio

1996 births
Living people
People from McComb, Mississippi
Players of American football from Mississippi
American football cornerbacks
Hinds Eagles football players
Middle Tennessee Blue Raiders football players
Dallas Cowboys players
Kansas City Chiefs players
San Francisco 49ers players